Stephanie De Sykes (born Stephanie Ryton, 1948) is an English singer and actress.

Early life
She attended Brays Grove School in Harlow, Essex; she returned to the school for a final reunion in June 2008 as guest of honour.

Career

Solo singer
De Sykes began her career as a session singer, often releasing tracks under other names. Her first release in 1972 was "Bright Shines The Light" on the Polydor label, credited as 'Verity'. She had her first hit in 1974 with the Roger Holman/Simon May penned "Born with a Smile on My Face" which reached number two in the UK Singles Chart. It also reached number 19 in Australia. The song featured in the ATV British TV serial "Crossroads", De Sykes played a character called Holly Brown in 1974. She also recorded the theme tune to the television programme The Golden Shot with the group Rain that same year. The theme song, "Golden Day", was written for them by Lynsey de Paul and Barry Blue. 

Around this time, the television company ATV Midlands started each day's broadcasting with a short film accompanied by another song performed by Rain with De Sykes singing vocals, "Odyssey" (often incorrectly referred to as "Life is a Beautiful Book"). After being cast as a pop singer in the ATV soap Crossroads, De Sykes returned to the UK Top 20 as a solo artist with the song "We'll Find Our Day", a song she performed in the series which was featured at Meg Mortimer's wedding in the UK TV soap opera in 1975. De Sykes appeared in the show as singer 'Holly Brown'. She also had a starring role in the comedy Side by Side.
In 1977, she sang "Cool Wind from the North", in Episode 1 of the Marc Bolan TV show, Marc.

Groups and backing singer
De Sykes was one of The Birds of Paris, a combination of backing singers used throughout the 1970s to add vocals to a number of disco groups and artists.  The other members of the Birds of Paris included Madeline Bell, Joanne Stone, Kay Garner, Sunny Leslie, Sue Glover, Vicki Brown and Katie Kissoon.

She was once a background vocalist of Love & Kisses, a concept group by producer Alec R Costandinos. She also sang with the group "Sphinx" and with Voyage.

De Sykes / Slater
De Sykes lived with Stuart Slater (born Stuart Leslie James Slater, 14 July 1945, Liverpool), lead singer of The Mojos, with whom she had two children, including their son, Toby Slater. De Sykes and Stuart Slater wrote two UK Eurovision Song Contest entries, Co-Co's "The Bad Old Days" and Prima Donna's "Love Enough for Two" in 1978 and 1980 respectively. In 1981, she teamed up with Angus Deayton to record a parody of that year's Eurovision winner "Making Your Mind Up" by Bucks Fizz. The song, "It's Only A Wind Up" by "Brown Ale", did not make the UK singles chart. De Sykes and Slater had one other song in the UK final, "All Around The World" in 1983, which was performed by Slater, ostensibly as a soloist, but with five musicians, including De Sykes on keyboards and vocals. The song placed fifth of the eight submissions. Notably, they were introduced by Terry Wogan in all of the broadcasts as "...the husband and wife team of..."

Later career
Her 1979 self-penned single release "Oh, What A Night For Romance" was featured on the BBC1 show Juke Box Jury, when it was panned by the panel of Dusty Springfield, Tony Blackburn, Jonathan King and Britt Ekland who unanimously correctly predicted it would be a 'miss'. De Sykes featured in a TV commercial for McVities biscuits in the 1983 Christmas period and soon after provided background vocals for Meat Loaf's 1984 album Bad Attitude, which included the Jim Steinman penned single, "Nowhere Fast".

Personal life
De Sykes lived with Stuart Slater (born Stuart Leslie James Slater, 14 July 1945, Liverpool), lead singer of The Mojos, with whom she had two sons: musician Toby Slater; and Barnaby Slater, a comedian, writer and producer.

She was then in a relationship with comedian/presenter Angus Deayton, and was credited with some of the female vocals on the 1985 second album of his parody band, The Hee Bee Gee Bees. Their relationship broke up in the early 1990s, after he began an affair with scriptwriter Lise Mayer in 1991.

She is a long time human rights activist who wishes to see an end to the violence between the Israelis and the Palestinians. In 2015 her song "Bomb Babies" was chosen as the opening track for the pro-peace anti-war album Not In Our Name, a collaboration of singers and musicians, songwriters and poets, the CD released in December 2015. She also performed the short poem on the same CD entitled "Dying Child" by Janis Hetherington.

See also
List of Eurovision: Your Decision contestants
List of performers on Top of the Pops

References

External links
 
 

1948 births
Living people
British women singers
British pop singers
Place of birth missing (living people)
British songwriters
English session musicians